The Beardmore W.B.II was a British biplane fighter prototype of the 1910s.

Development
A two-seat fighter of wooden construction, the W.B.II was built as a private venture by William Beardmore and Company. A development of the Royal Aircraft Factory B.E.2c it was designed by G. Tilghman Richards in 1916. Powered by a  Hispano-Suiza 8Bd engine, it carried two guns and design finished early in 1917 with the production of the first prototype.

Operational history
The W.B.II was first flown on 30 August 1917, and performance proved good. However, the Air Ministry deemed that the 8Bd engine, at that time in short supply, was needed more urgently for use in the S.E.5a fighter at that time serving with the Royal Flying Corps in World War I. As such, no further production of the W.B.II took place, however in 1920 two civil examples were produced, named the W.B.IIB.

Variants
W.B.II 2-seat fighter built as a private venture;two built.
W.B.IIa Adriatic A proposed version to have been powered by the Galloway Adriatic engine.
W.B.IIb A fast mail-plane civilian variant; two built.

Specifications (W.B.II)

References

1910s British fighter aircraft
W.B.2
Aircraft first flown in 1917